Rogues of Clwyd-Rhan is a webcomic by Reinder Dijkhuis. It was started in 1991 as a small-press comic in Dutch, entitled De Rovers van Clwyd-Rhan. It had an online incarnation in Dutch from November 1994 to August 1996, making it one of the first webcomics, and one of the oldest still updating. However, no further storylines were published on the web until July 2000, when the language switched to English, and new material began running. In September 2021 Dijkhuis began a Danish language translation of selected storylines under the title Det bedste fra røverne fra Clwyd-Rhan.

Introduction
Rogues of Clwyd-Rhan is a daily fantasy webcomic appearing in a wide range of formats over the years. Initially inspired by the classic Asterix comics and the television serial Maid Marian and her Merry Men, it has taken on influences ranging from the work of Marten Toonder to Cerebus and the novels of Terry Pratchett or the graphic novels of François Bourgeon.

Cast of characters
The core characters at the start of the series were the rogue Tamlin, a drunken, slobby version of Robin Hood, and his gangmates: the witch Atra, fan-girl-turned-gang-member Ragnarok, and Jake the Gnome. The gang have since been joined by the half-elven witch Kel, who has become the de facto lead of the comic. Former royal jester Jodoque joined later. Tamlin left the gang in the storyline The Corby Tribe and has not been seen since. His name was mentioned in a December 2006 strip, implying that he had returned, but when this storyline resumed in July 2007 the reference was revealed to be a red herring. It appears the gang has been joined by former barmaid Hildegard, but her status is not clear.
Kel and Ragnarok both have very small children. In recent years, the gang has made its living through farming and land ownership rather than actual rogueing.

Setting
Although the Kingdom of Clwyd-Rhan is ostensibly based on Medieval Wales and occasionally even resembles it, it is an entirely fictional location.

Travel takes place between Clwyd-Rhan and the Gnomian Republic, a new country in which Gnomes, Elves, Faeries and similar creatures live in a sometimes uneasy peace. Travel can be done through Gnomian magic, which runs on conspiracies, through portals, or, as a last resort, by ship.

External links
 Official website (archived)
 Rogues of Clwyd-Rhan on Comic Fury (includes redrawn versions of some earlier stories)
 Det bedste fra røverne fra Clwyd-Rhan (Danish version)

1991 comics debuts
1990s comics
1994 webcomic debuts
1990s webcomics
2000s webcomics
Dutch webcomics
Fantasy webcomics